"Burglary" is the third episode of the second series of British television sitcom, Bottom. It was first broadcast on 15 October 1992.

Synopsis 
Richie and Eddie catch a burglar in their living room.

Plot
The episode begins with Eddie staggering drunkenly into the flat at 1:30am. He went out four and a half hours earlier with £1.75 to buy two fish suppers for himself and Richie, but instead of going to the fish and chip shop, he went to the chemist and spent the money on cheap Old Spice, which he drank. While trying to find alcohol around the flat, Eddie drinks a bottle of bleach, and passes out. Richie cannot revive him, and so attaches a noose to his leg and hoists him upstairs to bed. Richie goes to his bedroom to masturbate.

A few seconds later, Richie hears a window smashing; coming out of his bedroom he hear more objects breaking downstairs. Richie wakes Eddie up and says that the burglars might be looking for drugs, so Eddie suggests throwing Lemsip down the stairs for them. Eddie goes back into his bedroom and brings a service revolver back out with him, and goes to shoot the lock off the hatch into the attic, until Richie asks why don't they just use the key and tells Eddie that the burglars will hear him shooting his gun. There is no ladder because the police have confiscated it when the nurses moved in next door earlier, so Richie has to climb on Eddie's back to reach. Richie falls off Eddie's back, and down the stairs, landing on the burglar (played by Paul Bradley).

Richie and Eddie tie the burglar to a chair using Sellotape, and try to interrogate him. Unfortunately, due to a lack of training on interrogation, Richie calls the police instead, but puts the phone down halfway through when Eddie finds the burglar's bag, which is full of silverware. Richie tries ending the phone call by claiming that he has been sleep-telephoning again. They plan to sell the silver and make a new life in the Bahamas, and are walking out of the flat when they realise that something must be done with the burglar. Richie sends Eddie onto the roof to get some poisoned pigeon pellets. While outside, he didn't notice that a second burglar is on the outer wall of the flat. Eddie falls through the glass roof but gets some pellets, which Eddie puts into one of the cups of tea he is making. They take the tea to the burglar but Eddie cannot remember which cup contains the poison, so, after Richie punishes Eddie by shoving a pencil up his nose, they force the burglar to drink all of them. The burglar promptly vomits. The police knock on the door.

Richie answers the door to the police while Eddie tries to hide the burglar. Richie claims that he telephoned the police in his sleep, and tries to close the door, but the police officers force their way past Richie into the flat. The police are suspicious about the state of the flat, but Richie says that he caused the mess by "sleep-vomiting". One of the officers approaches Eddie and points out that his paper is upside down and Eddie then says "So are my eyes". The officers find the shattered glass and Richie says they have been "sleep-glazing" again. Richie then throws insults to the officers and says that he has just been "sleep-slanging" again. The officers leave, after hitting Richie on the head with a truncheon for wasting police time. Eddie reveals that he had hidden the burglar by Sellotaping him to the ceiling. While they are attempting to get the burglar down by hitting him with a broom, the second burglar comes in through the window, and knocks Richie and Eddie unconscious with a club.

When Richie and Eddie wake up, they are stripped to their underwear. The room has been stripped bare except for two chairs that the pair are tied to. They have mouse traps positioned in front of their genitalia, and Eddie has a note attached to his knee. The episode ends when Eddie reads the note, which says "Sue Carpenter". This drops their guard, causing the mousetraps to trigger.

Consistency errors
In 's Up", Eddie says that he does not like fish fingers. However, in this episode Eddie is suggesting to Richie that they use stale fish fingers to poison the burglar only for Richie to remind Eddie that they (both of them) finished them off the previous Thursday.

References

1992 British television episodes
Bottom (TV series)
Burglary in fiction
Television episodes about theft